Mount Judea is an unincorporated community and census-designated place (CDP) in Newton County, Arkansas, United States. Mount Judea has a post office with ZIP code 72655.

It was first listed as a CDP in the 2020 census with a population of 110.

Education 
Public education for elementary and secondary school students is provided by the Deer/Mount Judea School District, which includes:
 Mount Judea Elementary School
 Mount Judea High School

It was previously a part of the Mount Judea School District. On July 1, 2004, the Mount Judea district consolidated with the Deer School District to form the Deer/Mount Judea School District.

Demographics

2020 census

Note: the US Census treats Hispanic/Latino as an ethnic category. This table excludes Latinos from the racial categories and assigns them to a separate category. Hispanics/Latinos can be of any race.

References

External links
 Newton County Historical Society

Unincorporated communities in Newton County, Arkansas
Unincorporated communities in Arkansas
Census-designated places in Newton County, Arkansas
Census-designated places in Arkansas